Austin Area may refer to

Greater Austin, Texas
The Austin, Minnesota area
The Austin, Pennsylvania area